Benet Kaci (born 4 August 1978) is a Kosovan media personality, journalist, and occasional singer known for hosting talk shows since 2000. His career in show business began when he started working in RTK. His first television hosting job was on RTKSound, a music program. He would later present the "News Blic" before going to host Albanians Got Talent on Top Channel. For the last 3 years, Benet has been concentrating on his business career. He made his triumphant return to the stage of Video Fest 2013 in Pristina, Kosovo on 4 June 2013. He also hosted this event another time on 13 June 2014 in his birth town, Gjakova.

Early life
Kaci was born in Gjakova, SFR Yugoslavia and raised in Pristina where he went to high school. He graduated from the Academy of Music and Arts of Albania in Tirana, Albania, with a MA in Faculty of Music.

References

External links
 Benet Kaci on Twitter

Albanians Got Talent starton te premten, Top Channel, 14 October 2010

Sonte shpallet talenti, Top Channel, 17 December 2010

Flori fitues i Video Festit 2013, Telegrafi, 4 June 2013

Leonora fituese e Video Festit 2014, Telegrafi, 13 June 2014

1978 births
Living people